Saproscincus is a genus of skinks native to Australia, sometimes referred to as shadeskinks. It contains the following species:
Saproscincus basiliscus (Ingram & Rawlinson, 1981) -  pale-lipped shadeskink
Saproscincus challengeri (Boulenger, 1887) - orange-tailed shadeskink, Border Ranges shadeskink, Challenger's skink
Saproscincus czechurai (Ingram & Rawlinson, 1981) - wedge-snouted shadeskink, Czechuras litter-skink 
Saproscincus eungellensis Sadlier et al., 2005 - Eungella shadeskink
Saproscincus hannahae Couper & Keim, 1998 - Hannah's shadeskink
Saproscincus lewisi Couper & Keim, 1998 - Northern Wet Tropics shadeskink, Cooktown shadeskink
Saproscincus mustelinus (O'Shaughnessy, 1874) - southern weasel skink, weasel shadeskink
Saproscincus oriarius Sadlier, 1998
Saproscincus rosei Wells & Wellington, 1985 - orange-tailed shadeskink, highland forest skink
Saproscincus saltus Hoskin, 2013 - Cape Melville shadeskink
Saproscincus spectabilis (De Vis, 1888) - gully shadeskink
Saproscincus tetradactylus (Greer & Kluge, 1980) - four-fingered shadeskink, four-toed litter-skink

Nota bene: A binomial authority in parentheses indicates that the species was originally described in a genus other than Saproscincus.

References

Further reading
Wells, Richard W.; Wellington, C. Ross. (1983). "A Synopsis of the Class Reptilia in Australia". Australian Journ. Herp. 1 (3-4): 73–129. (Saproscincus, new genus, p. 102).

External links

 
Lizard genera
Skinks of Australia
Taxa named by Richard Walter Wells
Taxa named by Cliff Ross Wellington